POL Oxygen was an international design, art and architecture quarterly magazine. The magazine existed between 2001 and 2008. It contained extended profiles that look at the lives, ideas and work of people working internationally. It was edited in Sydney, art directed in London, printed in Hong Kong and distributed worldwide.

References

External links
 POL Oxygen magazine website (archived in 2008)
 Art direction by Marcus Piper

Architecture magazines
Defunct magazines published in Australia
Magazines established in 2001
Magazines disestablished in 2008
Magazines published in Sydney
Quarterly magazines published in Australia